Sioniac is a commune in the Corrèze department of Nouvelle-Aquitaine region in central France.

Etymology
The origin of the Sioniac's name today has evolved over time. From records, it is first recorded as Siuiniacum during the 9th centaury, the suffice -acum being Latin for the property of the man Sivinius. It is later recorded as Siviniaco vico and Siviniacus in 859 and by 1315 as Seunhac in Occitan.

Geography

Population

History
Prior to the 9th Century, little is known about the origins of Sioniac but when Rodoulf, Archbishop of Bourges established a monastery down the hill at Beaulieu-sur-Dordogne, he gave the church of Saint-Saturnin at Sioniac in May 859 to the newly established monks. In June 859, Rudolf obtained a charter from King Charles the Bald to establish a market in Sioniac. This market remained the main market for Beaulieu until the medieval period. Other sources say the market could be older as the village was positioned on an ancient north-south trading route between Pay Arnac and Quercy.

Local culture and heritage

Religious buildings

Eglise Saint-Saturnin
 An older church served the area prior to the formation of the abbey at Beaulieu-sur-Dordogne. The current church was built in the 11th century, with later additions from the 12th, 15th and 17th centuries. It's a small Romanesque church with single nave with the first span a barrel vault while the other three consist of rib vaults. There are six semi-round columns with buried bases that have curved volute capitals at their tops and support double arches. Eight recessed columns with rebated capitals support the diagonal arches. It has a tall pointed gable bell tower dates which from the 15th century. It became a Historical Monument of France on 16 September 1949.

Other buildings

Manoir de Doumazac 
Now a private property, was an old hunting lodge of the Lords of d'Estresse. It was built in the 13th century and extensions added in the 16th century.

See also
Communes of the Corrèze department

References

Communes of Corrèze
Corrèze communes articles needing translation from French Wikipedia